Brandon Barlow (born January 25, 1998) is a professional gridiron football defensive lineman for the Toronto Argonauts of the Canadian Football League (CFL).

College career
After using a redshirt season in 2016, Barlow played college football for the Boston College Eagles from 2017 to 2021. He played in 50 games where he had 128 total tackles, 10 sacks, two forced fumbles, and one fumble recovery.

Professional career
On August 3, 2022, it was announced that Barlow had signed with the Toronto Argonauts. He soon after made his professional debut on August 12, 2022, against the Hamilton Tiger-Cats. In his next game, on August 26, 2022, also against the Tiger-Cats, he recorded his first sack when he tackled Dane Evans late in the fourth quarter. Barlow made his first start in the last game of the regular season on October 29, 2022, against the Montreal Alouettes where he had three defensive tackles. He played in 10 of the team's last 11 regular season games in 2022 where he had 18 defensive tackles, one special teams tackle, and one sack.

Personal life
Barlow was born to parents Reggie and Wendy Barlow and has one brother, Devon and one sister, Sherri.

References

External links
 Toronto Argonauts bio

1998 births
Living people
American football defensive linemen
American players of Canadian football
Canadian football defensive linemen
Players of American football from New York (state)
Players of Canadian football from New York (state)
Boston College Eagles football players
Toronto Argonauts players